Romércio Pereira da Conceição (born 25 February 1997), simply known as Romércio, is a Brazilian professional footballer who plays as a central defender.

Career
Romércio came through the youth ranks at Coritiba. He made senior debut for the club on 11 December 2016, the last game of the 2016 Campeonato Brasileiro Série A against Ponte Preta, when Coritiba had already released a number of first team players.

On 25 January 2022, Ararat-Armenia announced the signing of Romércio from Remo. On 19 January 2023, Ararat-Armenia announced that Romércio had left the club after his contract had expired.

Career statistics

Club

References

External links

Coritiba Foot Ball Club profile

1997 births
Living people
Sportspeople from Pernambuco
Brazilian footballers
Association football defenders
Campeonato Brasileiro Série A players
Campeonato Brasileiro Série B players
Coritiba Foot Ball Club players